Xerarionta is a genus of land snails in the family Helminthoglyptidae.

Species
The following species are recognised in the genus Xerarionta:
Xerarionta agnesae 
Xerarionta areolata 
†Xerarionta constenii 
Xerarionta intercisa  – plain cactus snail
Xerarionta kellettii  – Catalina cactus snail
Xerarionta levis 
Xerarionta orcutti 
Xerarionta pandorae 
Xerarionta redimita  – wreathed cactus snail
Xerarionta stearnsiana  – speckled cactus snail
Xerarionta tryoni  – bicolor cactus snail
†Xerarionta waltmilleri

References

 
Gastropod genera
Helminthoglyptidae
Taxonomy articles created by Polbot